Racton is a hamlet in the Chichester district of West Sussex, England. It lies on the B2147 road 2.1 miles (3.4 km) northeast of Emsworth and within the civil parish of Stoughton.  The hamlet lies along the River Ems.  0.4 miles north of the hamlet is the Racton Monument, constructed between 1766 and 1775 by the 2nd Earl of Halifax.  Another prominent structure just outside the hamlet is Lordington Manor, former home of the Pole family.  St Peter's Church, located in the centre of the hamlet, is a Grade I listed building, dating from the 12th-13th century.

References

External links

Villages in West Sussex